František Karkó (born 27 February 1944) is a former Slovakian footballer and manager.

References

External links
 ČMFS Statistics
 National Football Teams
 Fotbal.cz
 Kravany nad Dunajom

1944 births
Living people
Czechoslovak footballers
FC Zbrojovka Brno players
FK Fotbal Třinec players
Czechoslovak football managers
Slovak football managers
MFK Ružomberok managers
FK Fotbal Třinec managers
Association footballers not categorized by position